The 1974 EgyptAir Tupolev Tu-154 crash occurred on 10 July 1974, when an EgyptAir Tupolev-Tu-154 crashed during a training flight near Cairo International Airport, killing all six crew members on board.

Aircraft 
The aircraft was a brand-new Tupolev Tu-154 with serial number 74A-048 and manufacturing number 00-48, built at the Aviakor аviation plant. It was the first Tupolev Tu-154 delivered to EgyptAir, on 1 December 1973 and was named Nefertiti.

Accident 
The aircraft was performing a training flight at Cairo International Airport carrying a crew of six; two EgyptAir pilots and four Soviet instructors. After three hours and 14 minutes, the aircraft performed a touch and go on runway 23. during the maneuver, the aircraft pitched up, entered a stall, and crashed into the ground at 17:30 local time. All six occupants perished.

Investigation 
Investigators determined that the pilot flying had applied too much pitch up inputs. Incorrect center of gravity calculations and ballasts shifting in flight were also contributing factors.

Aftermath 
In 1975 EgyptAir returned its remaining Tupolev Tu-154s to the Soviet Union. In the same year, during production of the Tu-154B, systems for flaps resynchronization and stabilizers rearrangement were installed.

References 

Transport in Cairo
Aviation accidents and incidents in 1974
EgyptAir accidents and incidents
Aviation accidents and incidents in Egypt
Accidents and incidents involving the Tupolev Tu-154
History of Cairo
1974 in Egypt
July 1974 events in Africa
Airliner accidents and incidents caused by pilot error